The Ranger is a man-portable Unmanned underwater vehicle (UUV) that supports technology development related to mine warfare, expeditionary warfare, homeland defense, underwater surveillance / reconnaissance and other missions, made by the Massachusetts robotics firm iRobot. Ranger is also designed for ocean research and commercial applications related to search and survey, such as oceanography.

Unlike the iRobot Seaglider which is         propeller-less and motor-less, the Ranger has a propeller and is meant for shorter range missions.

It can carry a variety of sensors for different kinds of data monitoring. 

Ranger was initially developed by Nekton Research, Inc. in Durham, North Carolina. iRobot acquired Nekton Research in September, 2009.

References

External links
 iRobot Corporation: Ranger
 Overview of iRobot's entry into UUV market

Unmanned underwater vehicles
IRobot
2000s robots